Serdinya is a commune in the Pyrénées-Orientales department in southern France.

Residents are Serdinya are called Serdinyanais in French and Serdinyanencs in Catalan.

Geography

Localisation 
Serdinya is located in the canton of Les Pyrénées catalanes and in the arrondissement of Prades.

Transport 
Route nationale 116 (RN 116) connecting Perpignan and Bourg-Madame (near the Spanish and Andorran borders) passes through Serdinya. Serdinya station and Joncet station have rail connections to Villefranche-de-Conflent and Latour-de-Carol.

Politics and administration

Municipal administration

List of mayors

Population

See also
Communes of the Pyrénées-Orientales department

References

Communes of Pyrénées-Orientales